A list of films released in Japan in 1989 (see 1989 in film).

See also 
 1989 in Japan
 1989 in Japanese television

References

Footnotes

Sources

External links
 Japanese films of 1989 at the Internet Movie Database

1989
Lists of 1989 films by country or language
Films